The basketball tournaments of NCAA Season 88 are the Philippines' National Collegiate Athletic Association tournaments for basketball in its 2012–13 season. Colegio de San Juan de Letran hosted the season, starting with an opening ceremony held on June 23, 2012 followed by a double-header. Games then are subsequently being held at Filoil Flying V Arena, with seniors' games on Mondays, Thursdays and Saturdays aired by AKTV.

Seniors' tournament

Teams

Coaching changes

Elimination round

Team standings

Match-up results

Scores

Fourth-seed playoff

Bracket

Semifinals
In the semifinals, the higher seed has the twice-to-beat advantage, where they only have to win once, while their opponents twice, to progress.

San Beda vs. Perpetual

San Sebastian vs. Letran

Finals

 Finals Most Valuable Player:

Awards
The following were awarded as the best players this season:
 Most Valuable Player: 
 Rookie of the Year:   
 Defensive Player of the Year:   
 Most Improved Player: 
 Mythical Five:

Juniors' tournament

Elimination round

Team standings

Match-up results

Scores

Third-seed playoff

Bracket

Semifinals
In the semifinals, the higher seed has the twice-to-beat advantage, where they only have to win once, while their opponents twice, to progress.

San Beda vs. Letran

San Sebastian vs. LSGH

Finals

 Finals Most Valuable Player:

Awards
 Most Valuable Player: 
 Rookie of the Year: 
 Mythical Five:
 
 
 
 
 
 Most Improved Player: 
 Defensive Player of the Year:

See also
UAAP Season 75 basketball tournaments

References

External links
Official website

88
2012–13 in Philippine college basketball